Emmanuel Nii Akwei Addo (10 September 1943 - 7 February 2017) was a Ghanaian lawyer, judge and the Solicitor-General at the Office of the Attorney-General of Ghana from 1998 to 2007.

Early life and education 
Addo was born in Accra on 10 September 1943 to Emmanuel Addoquaye Addo and Rose Finola Addo (née Aryee). Addo attended Methodist Primary School in Koforidua and Government Boys School in Kumasi for his elementary education from 1949 to 1957. He was educated at the Accra Academy from 1958 to 1962 and Mfantsipim School from 1962 to 1964. In 1965, he entered the University of Ghana where he studied for his law degree, graduating in 1968. He passed the Ghana School of Law exams and was called to the Ghanaian Bar in 1969. He studied at Emmanuel College, Cambridge for a master's degree in Public International Law from 1977 to 1978.

Career 
In 1970, Addo joined the Attorney-General's Office in Accra and was in the same year, posted to the Attorney-General's Office in Ho in the Volta Region of Ghana. In 1973 he was put in charge of the Attorney General's Office in Ho and headed the office for the next seven years. In 1974, Addo was a member of the Ghanaian delegation on the Ghana-Togo Border Demarcation Commission. From 1979 to 1989 he was the Regional Representative of the Attorney General's Office in Tamale in the Northern Region of Ghana. In 1987, he was appointed a member of the Yendi reconciliation committee by the PNDC government to implement the Supreme Court Judgement on the Yendi Skin Dispute. He was appointed to serve as director of the International Law Division of the Attorney-General's department and the Ministry of Justice of Ghana.  
 
In 1989, Addo was promoted chief state attorney and in that same year was seconded to Ghana's Ministry of Foreign Affairs as director of the Legal and Consular Bureau and worked as legal advisor to the ministry from 1989 to 1998. From this position, he served on the sixth legal committee of the U.N. General Assembly. In 1997, he was elected a member of the International Law Commission of the United Nations for its forty-ninth session and remained a member until its fifty-eighth session held in 2006.  
 
In 2002, he was nominated as a judge of Court of Appeal and was sworn in on the 18th June 2002. In 2005, he became the United Nations independent expert on the situation of human rights in the Sudan. He served for five years as a judge. In 2009, a retired Addo was nominated by then President John Atta-Mills to serve as Chairman of an inter ministerial review committee to re-examine the agreement concluded between Ghana and Vodafone on Ghana Telecom.

Personal life
He was a Christian. He served as a lay preacher at Methodist Churches. Addo married Pamela Nyuietor Tay on 5th April in 1975 in Ho. They had three children; David-Tufa Nii Adotey Addo, Stephanie Naa Adoley Addo and Naa Adorkor Addo.

References

Alumni of the Accra Academy
Alumni of Emmanuel College, Cambridge
United Nations experts
1943 births
2017 deaths
International Law Commission officials
Ghanaian officials of the United Nations
Members of the International Law Commission